Stefan Schürf (born 8 March 1989) is a German former footballer who played for Bayern Munich II.

Schürf joined Bayern Munich from TSV Forstenried as a 12-year-old, and progressed through the junior team into the reserves, making his professional debut in a 3. Liga match against Stuttgarter Kickers in March 2009, coming on as a substitute for Manuel Duhnke. He was named in Bayern's first-team squad for the 2009–10 UEFA Champions League, where he was assigned the number 24. After 25 games in the 3rd Liga, all in 2009, Schürf suffered an anterior cruciate ligament injury midway through the 2009–10 season, which ruled him out for the rest of the campaign. He missed the entirety of the 2010–11 season, and announced his retirement from the game in June 2011.

References

External links
 

1989 births
Living people
German footballers
Germany youth international footballers
FC Bayern Munich II players
Association football defenders
3. Liga players
Footballers from Munich